Double Cross  is a 1973 Bollywood action film directed by Gogi Anand. The film stars Vijay Anand and Rekha .

Cast
Vijay Anand as Ajay Arya / Vijay Arya / Jimmy 
Rekha as Rekha 
Madan Puri as Magan Bhai    
Asha Sachdev as Lily    
Manmohan as Card-sharp 
Rajeeta Thakur as Sonia

Soundtrack
Music of the movie is composed by R. D. Burman.

External links
 

1973 films
1970s Hindi-language films
1973 action films
Films scored by R. D. Burman
Indian action films
Hindi-language action films